Pakt (English: "The Pact") is a Polish television series that originally aired on HBO Europe, running for two seasons between 2015 and 2016, about a journalist who investigates a web of lies and betrayal. The first season was based on the Norwegian TV series Mammon, while season 2 was an original concept. Pakt was one of the first series produced by HBO's international affiliates to be optioned for its American video-on-demand platform, HBO Now.

Principal cast
 Marcin Dorociński as Piotr Grodecki, journalist
 Witold Dębicki as Andrzej, newspaper editor
 Adam Woronowicz as Dariusz Skalski, finance minister
 Mariusz Bonaszewski as prime minister

References

External links
 
 Pakt at filmpolskie

2016 Polish television series endings
2015 Polish television series debuts
HBO Europe original programming
Polish-language HBO original programming